The Space Science and Engineering Center (SSEC) is a research and development center with primary focus on Earth science research and technology to enhance understanding of the atmosphere of Earth, the other planets in the Solar System, and the cosmos. SSEC is part of the University of Wisconsin–Madison's Graduate School.

Major SSEC initiatives
 Atmospheric studies of Earth and other planets
 Interactive computing, data access, and image processing
 Spaceflight hardware development and fabrication

See also
Cooperative Institute for Meteorological Satellite Studies (CIMSS)
McIDAS
Vis5D
Cave5D
VisAD
National Environmental Satellite, Data and Information Service (NESDIS)

External links
Space Science and Engineering Center (SSEC)
Atmospheric, Oceanic and Space Sciences Library @ Space Science and Engineering Center (SSEC)

University of Wisconsin–Madison